Pantanal Linhas Aéreas S.A. was a regional airline based in São Paulo, Brazil and incorporated by TAM Linhas Aéreas in 2013. It served destinations mainly in the southeast region of Brazil from its bases at Congonhas and Guarulhos airports in São Paulo.

History 

The origins of Pantanal Linhas Aéreas are in Pantanal Taxi Aéreo, an air taxi company created in 1989 in Campo Grande, Mato Grosso do Sul. This company, operating regular charter flights, provided convenient connections of cities in the Central-West Region of Brazil with flights of TAM Linhas Aéreas, which also provided two of the three Embraer EMB 110 Bandeirante of the fleet. In fact, as TAM Linhas Aéreas grew and dropped services to smaller cities, Pantanal became a viable solution for connectivity.

In 1990 the Brazilian Government partially deregulated the market and changed its airline concession policies, allowing the creation of new airlines. At this point Marcos Sampaio Ferreira decided to transform his air taxi company into a regular airline with operations independent from those of TAM Linhas Aéreas. The leased Bandeirantes were returned to TAM and in 1992 the first Embraer EMB 120 Brasília was received. With new aircraft and a new logo identity, depicting a Jabiru locally known as tuiuiú, regular flights started on April 12, 1993.

It became the first Brazilian airline to introduce the ATR 42 aircraft in December 1993. In 1995 it won a government concession for transportation of Petrobras employees and cargo through the Amazon region.

With growing services, in 1996 Pantanal transferred its maintenance base from Campo Grande to Curitiba-Bacacheri, which at the time became its hub. The same year, in partnership with Total and Interbrasil STAR Pantanal created the shuttle service between Rio de Janeiro-Santos Dumont and Belo Horizonte-Pampulha. The year ended with 18 destinations being served.

One of the consequences of the fast growth of Pantanal was the change of its logo which, starting in 1997 depicted two arrows and not anymore a Jabiru. The intention was to leave behind the idea of a purely regional carrier. The same year also brought a big blow to the operations of Pantanal: the National Civil Aviation Agency of Brazil closed Curitiba-Bacacheri Airport for regular flights. Pantanal had developed a hub and established its maintenance base at this facility. Having no other choice, Pantanal transferred its base to São Paulo-Congonhas Airport and changed its market focus to the Southeast and South regions of Brazil, eliminating destinations and increasing frequencies among the remaining.

Since TAM Linhas Aéreas ceased to operate purely regional flights, in December 1998 Pantanal and TAM established feeding and code-share agreements for the second time. Services were concentrated at São Paulo-Congonhas Airport using the airline's precious slots at this airport. Those agreements were suspended in 2001 due to the death of Rolim Amaro, president of TAM and a friend of the president of Pantanal, and to the economic crisis that followed thereafter.

Pantanal never regained economic stability and the crisis reached the limit in the beginning of 2009 when Pantanal applied for judicial reorganization to the Commercial Bankruptcy and Reorganization Court in São Paulo.  Pantanal continued to provide services despite its financial troubles.

Redemption came once again via TAM Linhas Aéreas: taking into account their long-lasting partnership and particularly the slots of Pantanal at São Paulo-Congonhas airport, on December 21, 2009, TAM Linhas Aéreas purchased Pantanal Linhas Aéreas. At that time, TAM decided to maintain Pantanal as a separate airline within the TAM Group integrated into its network. The base of the ATR 42 aircraft was changed to São Paulo-Guarulhos Airport and Pantanal slots at Congonhas were used by "TAM flights operated by Pantanal." In 2010 IATA changed the designator of Pantanal Linhas Aéreas from P8 to GP.

According to the National Civil Aviation Agency of Brazil (ANAC) in August 2010 Pantanal had 0.20% of the domestic market share in terms of passengers per kilometre flown. Starting September 2010, Pantanal ceased to appear independently on statistics and its data were integrated into the ones of TAM Group, which then comprised TAM Linhas Aéreas and Pantanal Linhas Aéreas.

Starting August 1, 2011, all Pantanal flights were operated on behalf of TAM using equipment leased from TAM and finally, on March 26, 2013, Brazilian authorities approved the incorporation of all Pantanal assets by TAM and Pantanal ceased to exist. The incorporation process was finalized on August 23, 2013.

Destinations 
Pantanal Linhas Aéreas operated scheduled services to the following destinations:

Araçatuba – Dario Guarita Airport
Araraquara – Bartolomeu de Gusmão Airport
Assis – Marcelo Pires Halzhausen Airport
Barretos – Chafei Amsei Airport
Bauru
Bauru Airport
Moussa Nakhl Tobias Airport (Bauru/Arealva)
Belo Horizonte
Pampulha/Carlos Drummond de Andrade Airport
Pres. Tancredo Neves International Airport (Confins)
Brasília – Pres. Juscelino Kubitschek International Airport
Caldas Novas – Nélson Ribeiro Guimarães Airport
Campinas – Viracopos International Airport
Campo Grande – Campo Grande International Airport
Caravelas – Caravelas Airport
Caxias do Sul – Hugo Cantergiani Airport
Corumbá – Corumbá International Airport
Criciúma/Forquilhinha – Diomício Freitas Airport
Cuiabá – Mal. Rondon International Airport
Curitiba
Afonso Pena International Airport
Bacacheri Airport
Dourados – Francisco de Matos Pereira Airport
Florianópolis – Hercílio Luz International Airport
Fortaleza – Pinto Martins International Airport
Foz do Iguaçu – Cataratas International Airport
Franca – Ten. Lund Presetto Airport
Goiânia – Santa Genoveva Airport
Governador Valadares – Cel. Altino Machado de Oliveira Airport
Ilhéus – Jorge Amado Airport
Ipatinga – Usiminas Airport
João Pessoa – Pres. Castro Pinto International Airport
Juiz de Fora – Francisco Álvares de Assis Airport (Serrinha)
Lins – Gov. Lucas Nogueira Garcez Airport
Marília – Frank Miloye Milenkowichi Airport
Maringá – Sílvio Name Júnior Regional Airport
Mucuri – Max Feffer Airport
Paranaguá – Santos Dumont Airport
Ponta Porã – Ponta Porã International Airport
Porto Alegre – Salgado Filho International Airport
Porto Seguro – Porto Seguro Airport
Presidente Prudente – Presidente Prudente Airport
Recife – Guararapes/Gilberto Freyre International Airport
Ribeirão Preto – Dr. Leite Lopes Airport
Rio de Janeiro
Galeão/Antonio Carlos Jobim International Airport
Santos Dumont Airport
Rio Verde – Gal. Leite de Castro Airport
Rondonópolis – Maestro Marinho Franco Airport
Salvador da Bahia – Dep. Luís Eduardo Magalhães International Airport
São José do Rio Preto – Prof. Eribelto Manoel Reino Airport
São Paulo
Congonhas Airport
Guarulhos/Gov. André Franco Montoro International Airport
Sorocaba – Bertram Luiz Leupolz Airport
Teresina – Sen. Petrônio Portella Airport
Uberaba – Mário de Almeida Franco Airport
Uberlândia – Ten. Cel. Av. César Bombonato Airport
Urubupungá (Ilha Solteira)
Varginha – Major-Brigadeiro Trompowsky Airport
Videira – Ângelo Ponzoni Airport
Vilhena – Brig. Camarão Airport

Fleet

Airline affinity program 
Between 2009 and 2013 Pantanal was part of TAM Fidelidade, the affinity program of TAM Linhas Aéreas.

See also 
List of defunct airlines of Brazil

References

External links 
Pantanal accidents as per Aviation Safety Database
Timetable Images of Pantanal
Pantanal Photo Archive at airliners.net

TAM Airlines
Defunct airlines of Brazil
Airlines established in 1993
Airlines disestablished in 2013